ATB is the stagename of André Tanneberger, (born 1973), a German DJ, musician, and producer of Trance music.

ATB may also refer to:

Banking
 Amsterdam Trade Bank, a Dutch bank
 Arab Tunisian Bank, a financial institution formed partly by Arab Bank
 ATB Financial (Alberta Treasury Branches), a financial institution owned by the Alberta government

Computing and Telecommunications
 Active Time Battle system, a feature of role-playing games
 All trunks busy, the reorder tone, or fast busy tone, on public switched telephone networks
 ATB (Advanced trace bus), a protocol in the Advanced Microcontroller Bus Architecture protocol specification.

Music and Entertainment
 Andy Timmons Band, a band led by guitarist Andy Timmons
 Atelier-Théâtre Burkinabé, a Burkinabè theatre group
 After the Burial, an American extreme metal band

Games
 Active-Time Battle, a combat system introduced by Hiroyuki Ito in Final Fantasy IV (1991) that differed from previous turn-based designs of game time-keeping

Sports
 All terrain bike, or mountain bike, an off-road bicycle
 All terrain boarding, an extreme sport also known as mountain boarding
 Around the Bay Road Race, a 30 km road race held every March in Hamilton, Ontario, Canada

Transportation and vehicles
 AtB, the public transit company of Trøndelag County Municipality, Norway
 Articulated tug and barge, a type of tugboat
 Automatische treinbeïnvloeding, a Dutch system of automatic train protection
 Advanced Technology Bomber, the program under which the B-2 Spirit stealth bomber was developed

Other uses
 Ability to benefit, in the United States, a measure applicable to students who have sufficient competency to benefit from post-secondary education but do not have a high school diploma or equivalent
ATB-Market, a Ukrainian network of retail shops
 Red ATB, a Bolivian television channel
 ATB Place, Edmonton, Alberta, Canada; a plaza
 Zaiwa language (ISO 639 code: atb)

See also

 America the Beautiful (disambiguation)